Events in the year 2023 in Iran, which is dominated by protests.

Incumbents 
 Supreme Leader of Iran: Ali Khamenei
 President of Iran: Ebrahim Raisi
 Speaker of the Parliament: Mohammad Bagher Ghalibaf
 Chief Justice: Gholam-Hossein Mohseni-Eje'i

Events 
Ongoing - 2021–2023 Iranian protests (2022 Iranian food protests and Mahsa Amini protests); Sistan and Baluchestan insurgency

 18 January – At least 150 people are injured by a magnitude 5.8 earthquake in Khoy, Khoy County, West Azerbaijan.
 19 January – Iran and South Korea summon each others' ambassadors in a deepening dispute between the countries, after South Korean President Yoon Suk-yeol called Iran "the enemy of the United Arab Emirates" while addressing South Korean troops stationed there.
 24 January – Two police officers are killed and a third is injured in an attack in Sistan and Baluchestan province.
 27 January – Attack on the Azerbaijani Embassy in Tehran: A guard is killed and two others are injured during a shooting at the Azerbaijani embassy in Tehran. The perpetrator is arrested.
 28 January – Drone attacks were reported across Iran.
 23 February – Iran publicly acknowledges the International Atomic Energy Agency accusation it has enriched uranium to 84%, bringing it close to developing a nuclear weapon. The Iranian government maintains its nuclear program is "completely peaceful"

Deaths 
7 January – Mohammad Mehdi Karami, 21
7 January – Seyyed Mohammad Hosseini, 39

References 

 
Iran
Iran
2020s in Iran
Years of the 21st century in Iran